Chris Lee Gamble (born March 11, 1983) is a former American football cornerback who played nine seasons for the Carolina Panthers of the National Football League (NFL). He played college football for Ohio State.

High school career and personal life
He attended Nova High School in Davie, Florida. He left Nova to join Dillard High School in Fort Lauderdale, Florida in 2000. He has two sons, including rugby league player Tyson Gamble.

College career
Gamble played cornerback, wide receiver, and all phases of special teams at Ohio State. He was an integral part of the 2002 National Championship team, which went 14-0.   Gamble played all 3 ways at Ohio State, earning 1st Team All-Big Ten honors, and 3rd Team All-America honors for cornerback. Gamble had 4 interceptions for the 2002 season, one of which he returned for a touchdown. Gamble was known for his game-breaking ability in all facets of the game, including defense, offense, and kick returning.

In 38 games, he started 18 times on defense and 12 times on offense (started on both offense and defense in five contests in 2002). Recorded 65 tackles (51 solos) with three stops behind the line of scrimmage, seven interceptions and 21 pass deflections. Also caught 40 passes for 609 yards (15.2 avg.), rushed six times for 68 yards (11.3 avg.) with a touchdown, returned 60 punts for 467 yards (7.8 avg.) and had 18 kickoff returns for 384 yards (21.3 avg.).

Gamble majored in sports and leisure studies while at Ohio State.

Professional career

Carolina Panthers
The Carolina Panthers selected Gamble in the first round (28th overall) in the 2004 NFL Draft. Gamble was the fourth cornerback drafted in 2004.

Head coach John Fox named Gamble the starting cornerback to begin the regular season, alongside Ricky Manning.
In 2004, Chris became the first rookie defensive player in Carolina Panthers history to start all 16 games, and earned Pro Football Weekly All-Rookie honors after establishing a Panthers rookie record with six interceptions, placing him in third in the NFL in interceptions.

In 2005, Gamble led the Panthers once again with 7 interceptions, ranking him fourth in the NFL.

In 2006, Gamble once again led the team in interceptions.  He tied teammates Ken Lucas and Richard Marshall with three interceptions each.

In 2007, he finished the year with 50 tackles with only 1 interception.

In 2008, he finished the year with 3 interceptions and he also tied for third in the NFL in passes defended with 19.

Through Gamble's career milestones, the Panthers rewarded him on November 28, 2008 to a six-year $53 million contract with $23 million guaranteed, making him one of the highest-paid defensive backs in the league.

On March 8, 2013, Gamble was released by the Panthers. He played nine seasons in Carolina and holds the franchise record for interceptions with 27. On March 11, 2013, Gamble retired.

Panthers franchise records
's NFL off-season, Chris Gamble held at least 3 Panthers franchise records, including:
 Interceptions: career (27)
 Int Ret Yds: season (157 in 2005), game (101 on 2005-11-06 @TAM)

NFL statistics

Key
 GP: games played
 COMB: combined tackles
 TOTAL: total tackles
 AST: assisted tackles
 SACK: sacks
 FF: forced fumbles
 FR: fumble recoveries
 FR YDS: fumble return yards 
 INT: interceptions
 IR YDS: interception return yards
 AVG IR: average interception return
 LNG: longest interception return
 TD: interceptions returned for touchdown
 PD: passes defensed

References

External links
Current Stats
Carolina Panthers bio

1983 births
American football cornerbacks
American football wide receivers
Carolina Panthers players
Living people
Ohio State Buckeyes football players
Sportspeople from Broward County, Florida
Nova High School alumni
Players of American football from Florida
Players of American football from Boston